Soul Survivors is a 2001 psychological thriller film starring Melissa Sagemiller as college student Cassie, whose boyfriend Sean (Casey Affleck) dies in a car accident that results from her driving after a night of partying. The accident leaves Cassie wracked with guilt and emotionally vulnerable to the point that she begins hallucinating strange visions and waking-dreams, even though Cassie's friends Annabel (Eliza Dushku) and Matt (Wes Bentley), as well as a local priest, Father Jude (Luke Wilson), all attempt to assist her in coping with the loss.

Plot
Cassie and Sean, as well as ex-boyfriend Matt and good friend Annabel, go to a nightclub situated in an old church with religious beliefs for Cassie. There, Cassie sees Deathmask (Carl Paoli), a man wearing a clear, plastic mask; and Hideous Dancer (Ken Moreno), an imposing man with a scarred face. Deathmask tries to grab her on the dance floor, but she pushes him away and steps outside the club with Sean.

In the parking lot, Matt eavesdrops on their conversation. Sean confesses his love for Cassie, who claims she feels the same way. When Sean returns to the club, Matt convinces Cassie to give him a last 'goodbye' kiss. Sean sees this, and reacts badly to it, giving Cassie the silent treatment as they drive off. Cassie, who is behind the wheel, continually looks away from the road until the car crashes. Cassie's next memory is of being rushed to the hospital; Matt and Annabel are unharmed, but Sean has been killed on impact.

During the school term that follows, Cassie has several visions (in bed) of Sean. She also has visions of Deathmask and Hideous Dancer in the company of Matt and Annabel. On several occasions, she believes she is being chased by the two men, although Annabel and Matt assure her that the incidents are all in her mind. After one chase, Cassie faints and is rescued by Father Jude, a young priest who is sympathetic to her fears and offers to listen if she ever needs someone to talk to.

A few nights later, after being chased again, Cassie knocks at the church door, and Father Jude gives her sanctuary. He gives her an amulet depicting St Jude and allows her to sleep in his small room in the church. Upon awakening that morning, Cassie sees that the calendar in the room reads 1981. She enters the office of the attending priest (Rick Snyder) and asks to speak to Father Jude but is told that Father Jude died in 1981.

After being made to participate in a swim competition, Cassie is chased by Deathmask. Defending herself with the tube of a fluorescent lamp, she ends up stabbing him in the stomach, but when Cassie returns with Matt, they find there is no body in the pool. Even though she believes that Matt and Annabel are conspiring against her with Deathmask and Hideous Dancer, Cassie requests that Matt take her home to her mother. Instead, he drives Cassie to the club, saying that he wishes to pick up Annabel. Cassie follows him but gets lost, eventually finding Annabel with a new lover, Raven (Angela Featherstone). When Raven tells Cassie to "leave or die", Cassie exits the club and makes her way back to the parking lot. There, Matt drunkenly insists on another "goodbye forever" kiss, but Cassie smashes a bottle on his head, knocking him unconscious, before pushing him from the car and driving away. She then arrives at the site of the accident, witnessing Annabel dying from it.

After then being run over by a car, Father Jude approaches her, offering assistance; after taking it, she comes to in the hospital. On a gurney next to her is Raven, who speaks a few words of comfort before dying. Father Jude arrives and explains everything she has experienced has been a sort of coma dream – in the original accident, Cassie and Sean had survived, while Matt and Annabel were killed. The occupants of the other car – Raven, Deathmask, and Hideous Dancer – were also fatally injured. Cassie has spent the course of the film in an astral state, wherein those who were killed in the accident attempt to keep her with them. Father Jude – who is an angel from heaven – and her visions of Sean were what kept Cassie alive. He then asks if she would be willing to die in order to save Sean's life. She agrees, and he then asks her if she would be willing to live for him. Cassie says that she doesn't want to die. She then awakes in a hospital room with her parents and Sean by her side; they embrace. She then marries the good guy in a future wedding.

Cast
 Melissa Sagemiller as Cassie
 Casey Affleck as Sean
 Eliza Dushku as Annabel
 Wes Bentley as Matt
 Angela Featherstone as Raven
 Luke Wilson as Father Jude
 Allen Hamilton as Dr. Haverston
 Carl Paoli as Deathmask
 Ken Moreno as Hideous Dancer
 Barbara E. Robertson as Margaret
 Richard Pickren as Ben
 Rick Snyder as Father MacManus
 Candace Kroslak as Cool Blonde
 Ryan Kitley as Young Cop
 Danny Goldberg as Campus Cop
 T. J. Jagodowski as ER Doctor
 Christine Dunford as ER Nurse
 Lusia Strus as Stern Nurse
 Scott Benjaminson as Second Campus Cop

Production
Artisan nabbed Carpenter’s spec script, at the time known as Soul Survivor for a mid-six-figure after a small bidding war with Paramount and Fox. Filming took place in Chicago and surrounding suburbs. Some scenes were also filmed in Gary, Indiana. The filming started in May 1999 and concluded in September 1999.

Reception
On Rotten Tomatoes, the film has an approval rating of 4%, based on reviews from 48 critics. On Metacritic, the film has a score of 20 out of 100 based on reviews from 11 critics, indicating "generally unfavorable reviews".

The New York Times panned the film, saying, "Yes, there is an explanation for everything, but it is a long time coming and not worth the wait." Empire gave the film two stars and said "We’ve been here before, and we’ll be here again." JoBlo.com rated the film 4 out of 10 and said " It just didn’t feel like a whole movie to me. It’s more of a collage of tensionless, repetitive scenes (a chase, an apparition, a chase, an apparition...and so on) patched together with crazy lighting flashing about and loud music booming in the background."

The film opened wide on 601 screens in the United States and Canada and grossed $1,140,698 for the weekend, the lowest for a wide release during 2001. It grossed $3.1 million in the United States and Canada and $4.3 million worldwide.

References

External links
 
 
 Soul Survivors at FEARnet

2001 films
2001 psychological thriller films
2000s teen films
American teen films
American psychological thriller films
Artisan Entertainment films
Original Film films
Films set in Massachusetts
Films set in universities and colleges
Films shot in Chicago
Films shot in Indiana
American ghost films
American supernatural thriller films
Films scored by Daniel Licht
2000s English-language films
Films directed by Stephen Carpenter
2000s American films